Zanjireh or Zanjirah may refer to:
 Zanjireh, East Azerbaijan
 Zanjireh, alternate name of Qarkhelar, East Azerbaijan Province
 Zanjireh-ye Olya, Ilam Province
 Zanjireh-ye Sofla, Ilam Province
 Zanjireh, West Azerbaijan